Norristown Area School District is a school district located in Montgomery County, Pennsylvania. The school district serves the borough of Norristown, East Norriton Township, and West Norriton Township municipalities in central Montgomery County, just north-west of Philadelphia.  

The district is compiled of six elementary schools, three middle schools, and two high schools. The Philadelphia Inquirer has recognized Norristown Area School District as the most diverse district in the Pennsylvanian suburbs of the greater Philadelphia area.  Dr. Janet C. Samuels was appointed superintendent on January 11, 2008. As of the 2018-2019 academic year, Mr. Christopher Dormer will be the superintendent for this district.

Schools
Cole Manor Elementary School
J.K. Gotwals Elementary School
W.S. Hancock Elementary School
Marshall Street Elementary School
Paul V. Fly Elementary School
Whitehall Elementary School
East Norriton Middle School
Eisenhower Science and Technology Leadership Academy
Stewart Middle School
Norristown Area High School
Roosevelt Alternative School

History

The Norristown Area High School (NAHS) was established in 1870 in the Borough of Norristown and relocated to West Norriton Township in 1972. The student population is about 1900 students in grades 9-12.

The high school utilizes a modified block schedule, offers all core courses in a college prep and weighted honors format, and has entered into a partnership with Montgomery County Community College to offer dual enrollment (both high school and college credit) in a number of courses.

Athletics
Norristown Area High School was a member of the Suburban One League, American Conference, one of four remaining founding members of the league. In 2016 the school joined the Pioneer Athletic Conference, Liberty Division, after a unanimous vote by the board in January 2015.

The Norristown Boys Basketball program stands on its history and championship traditions. Their basketball program continues to grow stronger each year by putting an emphasis on academics, character, and hard work. The basketball team holds one state championship, 5 regional championships, 8 District One Championships, and 30 League Championships. In 2017, the Norristown Area School District hired NAHS alum Dana "Binky" Johnson as the new head coach.

Board of School Directors 
The nine member board are elected at-large that serve 4-year terms. They are elected by voters in East Norriton, Norristown, and West Norriton.
 Turea Hutson, President
 Matt Rivera, Vice President
 Shae Ashe
 Tiffani Hendley
 George Kennedy
 Louis Mason
 Janice Pearce
 Sandra White
 Jamila Winder

Notable alumni

Betty Bobbitt, star of Prisoner: Cell Block H
Steve Bono, former NFL quarterback
Tom Lasorda, Major League Baseball pitcher, coach, and manager
Bobby Mitchell, former Major League Baseball player
Jerry Spinelli, children's author.  Two of his books are set in the Norristown area.
 Kellee Stewart, graduated from NASD in 1993.
Henry “Big H” Williams, Former NBA player for Utah Stars and New York Knicks
Khalif Wyatt (born 1991), American basketball player for Hapoel Holon of the Israeli Basketball Premier League

References

External links
Norristown Area School District Homepage
Norristown Area High School Alumni Association
Official Norristown Area School District Press Releases
Norristown Area School District's BoardDocs website

1870 establishments in Pennsylvania
School District
School districts established in 1870
School districts in Montgomery County, Pennsylvania